Praksis Arkitekter is a Danish architectural firm with offices in Troense, Svendborg. It was founded and is owned by Mette Tony and Mads Bjørn Hansen. The firm received Dreyers Fond's Honorary Award for Architecture in 2017.

Mads Bjørn and Mette Tony have most recently received Hack Kampmann's Architecture Prize 2020 2017, Dreyer's Foundation's Honorary Prize 2017, the Concrete Element Prize 2017 for the Frihavns Tårnet, Store Arne 2017 for “Copenhagen's best building 2017” for Forskerboligerne in Carlsberg city.

Selected projects
 Port Authority Building, Svendborg, Denmark (2010)
 Kulturmaskinen , Odense, Denmark (2010)
 Researchers' House, Carlsberg, Copenhagen )2016)
 Oluf Børgesens Plads, Odense (competition win 2016)
 Maltfabrikken, Ebeltoft, Denmark (competition win 2016)
 Steiner Skolen expansion, Odense, Denmark
Frihavns Tårnet, Nordhavn, Copenhagen (2017)
Svinkløv Badehotel, 2017
Spritten Art Center Aalborg, 2019
UNESCO besøgscenter Stevns klint, 2019
Karen Blixen Museet, 2021

Awards
 2008 Eckersberg Medals for Mette Tony and Mads Bjørn Hansen
 2017 Danish Concrete Element Award for Frihavns Tårnet 
 2017 Dreyer's Honorary Award
2017 Nykredit Architecture Prize

References

External links
 Official website

Architecture firms of Denmark
Danish companies established in 2006
Design companies established in 2006
Companies based in Svendborg Municipality